Reggie A. Gilbert Jr. (born April 1, 1993) is an American football outside linebacker who is a free agent. He played college football at Arizona and was signed by the Green Bay Packers as an undrafted free agent in 2016. He also played for the Tennessee Titans, Arizona Cardinals, and Jacksonville Jaguars.

Professional career

Green Bay Packers
Gilbert signed with the Green Bay Packers as an undrafted free agent on May 6, 2016. He was waived by the Packers on September 3, 2016 and was signed to the practice squad the next day. He signed a reserve/future contract with the Packers on January 24, 2017.

On September 2, 2017, Gilbert was waived by the Packers and was signed to the practice squad the next day. He was promoted to the active roster on December 22, 2017. Gilbert saw increased playing time during the 2018 season, and contributed with 38 tackles and 2.5 sacks. He was re-signed by the Packers as an exclusive rights free agent on March 11, 2019.

Tennessee Titans
On August 28, 2019, the Packers traded Gilbert to the Tennessee Titans in exchange for a seventh round pick in the 2020 NFL Draft. Gilbert finished the 2019 regular season with 22 tackles, a sack, and one pass defense.

On March 10, 2020, Gilbert was re-signed by the Titans to a one-year contract with a salary of $750,000 per year. He was waived/injured on August 11, 2020, and reverted to the team's injured reserve list the next day. He was waived on September 8, 2020.

Arizona Cardinals
On October 21, 2020, Gilbert was signed to the Arizona Cardinals practice squad.

Jacksonville Jaguars
On November 24, 2020, Gilbert was signed by the Jacksonville Jaguars off of the Cardinals' practice squad. He was waived on December 14, 2020.

Detroit Lions
On June 7, 2021, Gilbert was signed by the Detroit Lions. He was waived on August 4, 2021.

NFL career statistics

References

External links
Tennessee Titans bio
Green Bay Packers bio
Arizona Wildcats bio

1993 births
Living people
American football linebackers
Arizona Cardinals players
Arizona Wildcats football players
Detroit Lions players
Green Bay Packers players
Jacksonville Jaguars players
Players of American football from Phoenix, Arizona
Tennessee Titans players